Waleswood railway station is a former railway station on the Great Central Railway's main line between Sheffield Victoria and Worksop, England.

The station was opened on 1 July 1907 by public demand, where the road from Rotherham to Clowne road below the line and the Waleswood Curve, a connection from the Derbyshire Lines of the Manchester, Sheffield and Lincolnshire Railway at Killamarsh, joins the east–west main line. It was adjacent to Waleswood Colliery.

The station buildings were of all wood construction with flanking wooden platforms.

The station booking hall suffered a major fire on 24 May 1953, when much internal damage was caused and rail traffic was disrupted.

The station was closed on 7 March 1955 and has since been demolished.

References

Sources

External links
Waleswood Station on 1955 OS Map: via npemaps
Waleswood Station on old maps: via Old-maps

Disused railway stations in Rotherham
Former Great Central Railway stations
Railway stations in Great Britain opened in 1907
Railway stations in Great Britain closed in 1955